A disk operating system (DOS) is a computer operating system that resides on and can use a disk storage device, such as a floppy disk, hard disk drive, or optical disc. A disk operating system provides a file system for organizing, reading, and writing files on the storage disk. Strictly, this definition does not include any other functionality, so it does not apply to more complex OSes, such as Microsoft Windows, and is more appropriately used only for older generations of operating systems.

Disk operating systems for mainframes, minicomputers, microprocessors, and home computers are usually loaded from the disks as part of the boot process.

History
Early computers predate disk drives, floppy disks, or modern flash storage. Early storage devices such as delay lines, core memories, punched cards, punched tape, magnetic tape, and magnetic drums are used instead. Early microcomputers and home computers use paper tape, audio cassette tape (such as Kansas City standard), or nothing. Without permanent storage, program and data entry is done at front panel switches directly into memory or through a computer terminal or keyboard, sometimes controlled by a BASIC interpreter in ROM. When power is turned off, any information is lost.

In the early 1960s, as disk drives became larger and more affordable, various mainframe and minicomputer vendors introduced disk operating systems and modified existing operating systems to use disks.

Hard disks and floppy disk drives require software to manage rapid access to block storage of sequential and other data. For most microcomputers, a disk drive of any kind was an optional peripheral. Systems can be used with a tape drive or booted without a storage device at all. The disk operating system component of the operating system was only needed when a disk drive was used.

By the time IBM announced the System/360 mainframes, the concept of a disk operating system was well established. Although IBM did offer Basic Programming Support (BPS/360) and TOS/360 for small systems, they were out of the mainstream and most customers used either DOS/360 or OS/360.

Most home and personal computers of the late 1970s and 1980s used a disk operating system, most often with "DOS" in the name and simply referred to as "DOS" within their respective communities: CBM DOS for Commodore 8-bit systems, Atari DOS for the Atari 8-bit family, TRS-DOS for the TRS-80, Apple DOS and ProDOS for the Apple II, and MS-DOS for IBM PC compatibles.

Usually, a disk operating system was loaded from a disk. Among the exceptions were Commodore, whose DOS resided on ROM chips in the disk drives. The Lt. Kernal hard disk subsystem for the Commodore 64 and Commodore 128 models stored its DOS on the disk, as is the case with modern systems, and loaded the DOS into RAM at boot time; AmigaDOS also mostly resided in ROM as a part of a Kickstart firmware, but a few select versions were also loaded from disk; the British BBC Micro's optional Disc Filing System, DFS, offered as a kit with a disk controller chip, a ROM chip, and few logic chips, to be installed inside the computer.

OS extensions
Apple DOS is the primary operating system for the Apple II series of computers, from 1979 with the introduction of the floppy disk drive, until 1983 when it was replaced by ProDOS.
Commodore DOS is on 8-bit Commodore computers such as the Commodore 64. Unlike most other DOS systems, it is integrated into the disk drives, not loaded into the computer's own memory.
Atari DOS is used by the Atari 8-bit family of computers. The Atari OS only offers low-level disk-access, so an extra layer called DOS can be booted from a floppy for higher level functions such as filesystems. Third-party replacements for Atari DOS include DOS XL, SpartaDOS, MyDOS, TurboDOS, and Top-DOS.
MSX-DOS is for the MSX computer standard. The initial version, released in 1984, is MS-DOS 1.0 ported to Z80. In 1988, version 2 has facilities such as subdirectories, memory management, and environment strings. The MSX-DOS kernel resides in ROM (built-in on the disk controller) so basic file access capacity is available even without the command interpreter, by using BASIC extended commands.
Disc Filing System (DFS) is an optional component for the Acorn BBC Micro, as a kit with a disk controller chip, a ROM chip, and a few logic chips, to be installed inside the computer.
Advanced Disc Filing System (ADFS) is a successor to Acorn's DFS.
AMSDOS is for the Amstrad CPC computers.
GDOS and G+DOS is for the +D and DISCiPLE disk interfaces for the ZX Spectrum.

Main OSes
Some disk operating systems are the operating systems for the entire computer system.
The Burroughs (now Unisys) Master Control Program (MCP) for the B5000 originally runs from a drum, but starting with the B5500 it runs from a disk. It is the basis for the MCP on the B6500, B7500, and successors.
The SIPROS, Chippewa Operating System (COS), SCOPE, MACE and KRONOS operating systems on the Control Data Corporation  (CDC) 6000 series and 7600 are all disk operating systems. KRONOS became NOS and SCOPE became NOS/BE.
The GECOS operating system for the GE (later Honeywell and Groupe Bull) 600 family of mainframe computers (it later became GCOS).
The IBM Basic Operating System/360 (BOS/360), Disk Operating System/360 (DOS/360) and Operating System/360 (OS/360) are standard for all but the smallest System/360 installations; the 360/67 also has Control Program-67 /Cambridge Monitor System (CP-67/CMS) and Time Sharing System/360  (TSS/360). BOS is gone, CP-67/CMS has evolved into z/VM, DOS has evolved into z/VSE, OS has evolved into z/OS and TSS/360 evolved into TSS/370 PRPQ, which is now gone..
The DOS-11 operating system for DEC PDP-11 minicomputers.
CP/M is a disk operating system, as the main or alternate operating system for numerous microcomputers of the 1970s and 1980s.
TRSDOS is the operating system for the TRS-80 line of computers from Tandy.
MS-DOS for IBM PC compatibles with Intel x86 CPUs. 86-DOS was modeled on CP/M, and then was adapted as the basis for Microsoft's MS-DOS. It was rebranded by IBM as PC DOS until 1993. Various compatible systems were later produced by different organizations, starting with DR-DOS in 1988.

See also
 Live CD

References

Disk operating systems